The Qatar International Friendship Tournament is an association football competition. In its 10th year, it was held in Doha, Qatar 38 March 2012.

The edition reverted to featuring youth teams as opposed to the 9th edition that featured senior teams. Four teams were represented in the tournament. The tournament was won by Greece.

Participating nations

 China
 Greece 
 Qatar
 United Arab Emirates

Matches

Round robin tournament

Winner

References

 

2011–12 in Greek football
2011–12 in Emirati football
International
2012 in Chinese football
Qatar International Friendship Tournament